The  ('Declaration by al-Mufaddal of the Oneness of God'), also known as the  ('Book on the Beginning of Creation and the Incitement to Contemplation'), is a ninth-century treatise concerned with proving the existence of God, attributed to the early Shi'i Muslim leader al-Mufaddal ibn Umar al-Ju'fi (died before 799). The work presents itself as a dialogue between al-Mufaddal and the Shi'i Imam Ja'far al-Sadiq (–765), who is the main speaker.

Rather than by Shi'i doctrine, their content appears to be influenced by Mu'tazilism, a rationalistic school of Islamic speculative theology.

The  is a revised version of a work falsely attributed to the famous Mu'tazili litterateur al-Jahiz (died 868) under the title  ('Book of Proofs and Contemplation on Creation and Administration').

Contents

The work sets out to prove the existence of God based on the argument from design (also called the teleological argument). It consists of a series of lectures about the existence and oneness of God presented to al-Mufaddal by Ja'far al-Sadiq, who is answering a challenge made to him by the self-declared atheist Ibn Abi al-Awja'. In four 'sessions', Ja'far argues that the cosmic order and harmony which can be detected throughout nature necessitates the existence of a wise creator.

The  is in fact not an original work. Instead, it is a revised version of a work also attributed to the famous Mu'tazili litterateur al-Jahiz (died 868) under the title  ('Book of Proofs and Contemplation on Creation and Administration'). The attribution of this work to al-Jahiz is probably spurious as well, though it was still likely written in the ninth century. Compared to pseudo-Jahiz's , the  adds an introduction that sets up the frame story involving al-Mufaddal, Ibn Abi al-Awja', and Ja'far al-Sadiq, as well rhymed praises of God at the beginning of each chapter, and a brief concluding passage. According to Melhem Chokr, the versions attributed to al-Mufaddal and to al-Jahiz are both based on an unknown earlier work, with the version attributed to al-Mufaddal being more faithfull to the original.

The / contains many parallels with Syriac Christian literature, such as the commentaries on the Hexameron (the six days of creation as described in Genesis) written by Jacob of Edessa (–708) and Moses bar Kepha (–903), as well as Job of Edessa's encyclopedic work on natural philosopy called the Book of Treasures. Its teleological proof of the existence of God—based upon a discussion of the four elements, minerals, plants, animals, meteorology, and the human being—was likely inspired by the pseudo-Aristotelian work  ('On the Universe', third/second century BCE), a work also used by the Syriac authors mentioned above.

The idea that contemplating the works of nature leads to a knowledge of God is also found in the Quran. However, in the case of the /, the idea is set in a philosophical framework that clearly goes back on Hellenistic models. Some of the enemies cited in the work are Diagoras (5th century BCE) and Epicurus (341–270 BCE), both reviled since late antiquity for their alleged atheism, as well as Mani (–274 or 277 CE), the founding prophet of Manichaeism; a certain Dūsī, and all those who would deny the providence and purposefullness of God.

Reception

Apart from al-Majlisi (died 1699), both works were also known to such Twelver scholars as al-Najashi (–1058), Ibn Shahrashub (died 1192), Ibn Tawus (1193–1266).

References

Sources used
 ( in vol. 3, pp. 57–151;  in vol. 3, pp. 152–198)

 (reprinted in )

9th-century Arabic books
Islamic philosophical texts
Pseudepigraphy
Shia theology books